Ariyaatha Veethikal is a 1984 Indian Malayalam-language film directed by K. S. Sethumadhavan and written by John Paul. It stars Madhu, Mohanlal, Mammootty, Ramachandran and Rahman. The soundtrack of the film was composed by M. S. Viswanathan.

Plot

The film revolves around Judge Jaganathan (Madhu), who stands by his morals, no matter what kind of problems he faces.

Cast
Madhu as Judge Jaganathan
Mohanlal as Balan
Mammootty as Ravi
Ramachandran as Shekarankutty
Manian Pillai Raju as Soman
Rahman as Babu
Karamana Janardhanan Nair as Bhaskaran
Rohini as Sheela
Sabitha Anand as Ambili
Sukumari as Kalyanikutty
Kaviyoor Ponnamma as Janaki
Kalashala Babu as Raghavan

Soundtrack
The music was composed by M. S. Viswanathan and the lyrics were written by P. Bhaskaran and Poovachal Khader.

References

External links 
 

1984 films
1980s Malayalam-language films
Films scored by M. S. Viswanathan
Films directed by K. S. Sethumadhavan